Slaviša Stojanović (born 6 December 1969) is a Slovenian professional football manager and former player. As manager, Stojanović has won the Slovenian PrvaLiga twice, with Domžale, and the Serbian SuperLiga once, with Red Star Belgrade.

Managerial career

Early career
Slaviša Stojanović started his managerial career with the youth selections of Slovan. In 2001, he became the manager of the Slovenian Second League side Livar.

Domžale
He was appointed at Domžale in 2002. In his first year in charge, Domžale were promoted to the national top division, the Slovenian PrvaLiga. In 2007 and 2008, Stojanović won back-to-back national titles with the team.

Celje
Stojanović signed for Celje in 2008.

UAE national team
In 2009, he was appointed as an assistant manager of Srečko Katanec at the United Arab Emirates. On 6 September 2011, Katanec was sacked after two successive defeats in the third round of qualifiers for the 2014 FIFA World Cup. Stojanović as the assistant manager was sacked as well.

Slovenia national team
On 24 October 2011, Stojanović became the new manager of the Slovenia national team after the Football Association of Slovenia had had the contract with Matjaž Kek terminated by mutual agreement earlier that day. On 9 December 2012, he resigned as the manager of the Slovenia national team.

Red Star Belgrade
On 24 June 2013, Stojanović replaced Ricardo Sá Pinto as a manager of Red Star Belgrade. He lost his first game in the Serbian SuperLiga against Javor Ivanjica. In the second part of the 2013–14 season, Red Star won 15 games in a row and ultimately won the Serbian championship for the first time in seven years.

Lierse
On 5 September 2014, he replaced Stanley Menzo as a manager of Lierse. He signed a contract until the end of the season. He resigned on 28 January 2015.

Changchun Yatai
On 13 January 2016, Stojanović was appointed the new manager of Changchun Yatai, replacing Marijo Tot. However, his reign was short-lived, with Stojanović getting fired on 4 May 2016. He was replaced by former Beijing Guoan and Guangzhou Evergrande manager Lee Jang-soo.

Levski Sofia
After a spell with Riga FC, Stojanović was appointed at Bulgarian club Levski Sofia on 30 July 2018, replacing Delio Rossi. The term was short-lived, as he was released by the club on 21 January 2019, amid reports of an upcoming move to become head coach of the Latvia national team.

Latvia national team 
On 13 March 2019, Stojanović was confirmed as the new head coach of the Latvia national team. He was sacked in January 2020 after losing nine out of ten matches in the UEFA Euro 2020 qualifiers.

Return to Levski
In November 2020, Stojanović returned to Levski. Alongside managerial role, he also became a new director of football at the club. In March 2021, Stojanović was tested positive for COVID-19 and later hospitalized. He was absent from Levski's bench until the end of the season. On 20 May 2021, Levski issued a statement declaring Stojanović's contract with the club would not be prolonged beyond the 2020–21 season.

Honours

Manager
Domžale
 Slovenian PrvaLiga: 2006–07, 2007–08
 Slovenian Supercup: 2007

Red Star Belgrade
 Serbian SuperLiga: 2013–14

References 

1969 births
Living people
People from Vlasotince
Yugoslav footballers
Slovenian footballers
NK Ljubljana players
NK Celje players
NK Ivančna Gorica players
Slovenian PrvaLiga players
Slovenian Second League players
Association football defenders
Slovenian football managers
NK Domžale managers
NK Celje managers
Slovenia national football team managers
Red Star Belgrade managers
Lierse S.K. managers
PFC Levski Sofia managers
Latvia national football team managers
Expatriate football managers in Serbia
Expatriate football managers in Belgium
Expatriate football managers in China
Expatriate football managers in Latvia
Expatriate football managers in Bulgaria
Slovenian expatriate sportspeople in Serbia
Slovenian expatriate sportspeople in Belgium
Slovenian expatriate sportspeople in China
Slovenian expatriate sportspeople in Latvia
Slovenian expatriate sportspeople in Bulgaria
Slovenian expatriate football managers
Serbian SuperLiga managers
Belgian Pro League managers
Chinese Super League managers